Ezequiel Vidal (born 18 August 1987) is an Argentine professional footballer who plays as a forward for UAI Urquiza.

Career
Vidal began his career with UAI Urquiza. He remained with them for nine years, featuring one hundred and ninety-one times and scoring fifty-three goals across three divisions; Primera D, Primera C and Primera B Metropolitana. His final season with UAI Urquiza was in 2015 when he made thirteen appearances. During his time with UAI Urquiza, Vidal spent time out on loan with Primera D team Lugano; he scored eight goals in thirty matches. In January 2016, Vidal joined Primera B Metropolitana side Talleres. He made his debut versus Platense on 5 February, with his first goal coming on 27 April against Defensores de Belgrano.

On 7 June 2018, Vidal signed for fellow Primera B Metropolitana team Acassuso. He departed after one season, having notched five goals in his time with the club. July 2019 saw Vidal rejoin UAI Urquiza.

Career statistics
.

Honours
UAI Urquiza
Primera D Metropolitana: 2009–10
Primera C Metropolitana: 2012–13

References

External links

1987 births
Living people
Footballers from Buenos Aires
Argentine footballers
Association football forwards
Primera D Metropolitana players
Primera C Metropolitana players
Primera B Metropolitana players
UAI Urquiza players
Club Atlético Lugano players
Talleres de Remedios de Escalada footballers
Club Atlético Acassuso footballers